Soledad Villafranca los Arcos (1880–1948) was a Spanish anarchist, activist, pedagogue at the Escuela Moderna, and companion of Francisco Ferrer.

Life 

Soledad Villafranca los Arcos was born in the Spanish Navarre town of Agoitz in 1880. Her wealthy family moved to Barcelona in 1902. Villafranca became the director of the elementary program as Francisco Ferrer's Barcelonean Escuela Moderna. The school's librarian, Mateu Morral, might have attempted to kill the king in 1906 as an expression of his frustrated love for her.

Freed from implication in the event, Villafranca accompanied Ferrer during his 1907–1909 exile, where they spread anarchist propaganda across Europe before returning to Spain. When Ferrer was jailed in connection with the Tragic Week, Villafranca testified at his trial before entering exile in Aragon, first in Alcañiz, then in Teruel. After Ferrer's execution, she worked to keep his tradition alive and was linked in the  assassination of Prime Minister José Canalejas. Villafranca withdrew from activism after marrying Carlos Woessner of Germany. Villafranca moved to Cologne during the Spanish Civil War and returned to Barcelona in 1939. She died there in 1948.

References

Further reading 

 

1880 births
1948 deaths
People from Aoiz (comarca)
People from Barcelona
Spanish anarchists
Spanish educators
Spanish women educators
19th-century Spanish women
20th-century Spanish women